Without Compromise is a 1922 American silent Western film directed by Emmett J. Flynn and written by Bernard McConville. It is based on the 1922 novel Without Compromise by Lillian Bennett-Thompson and George Hubbard. The film stars William Farnum, Lois Wilson, Robert McKim, Tully Marshall, Hardee Kirkland, and Otis Harlan. The film was released on October 29, 1922, by Fox Film Corporation.

Plot summary

Cast        
 William Farnum as Dick Leighton
 Lois Wilson as Jean Ainsworth
 Robert McKim as David Ainsworth
 Tully Marshall as Samuel McAllister
 Hardee Kirkland as Judge Gordon Randolph
 Otis Harlan as Dr. Evans
 Will Walling as Bill Murray
 Alma Bennett as Nora Foster
 Eugene Pallette as Tommy Ainsworth
 Fred Kohler as Cass Blake
 John Francis Dillon as Jackson

References

External links
 
 
 

1922 films
1920s English-language films
1922 Western (genre) films
Fox Film films
Films directed by Emmett J. Flynn
American black-and-white films
Silent American Western (genre) films
1920s American films